This is a list of common terms used in the sport of ice hockey along with the definitions of these terms.

0-9

A

B

C

D

E

F

G

H

I

J

K

L

M

N

O

P

Q

R

S

T

U

V

W

Y

Z

See also
Ice hockey statistics

References
 

 
Ice hockey terms, Glossary Of
Wikipedia glossaries using description lists